The Queensland Herbarium (Index Herbariorum code: BRI) is situated at the Brisbane Botanic Gardens, Mount Coot-tha, in Brisbane, Queensland, Australia.  It is part of Queensland's Department of Environment and Science.  It is responsible for discovering, describing, monitoring, modelling, surveying, naming and classifying Queensland's plants, and is the focus for information and research on the state's plants and plant communities.

Origins
The history of the Herbarium as an institution starts in 1855 with the appointment of Walter Hill as Superintendent of the Brisbane Botanic Gardens, four years before Queensland separated from New South Wales as a colony.  In 1859, with Separation, Hill was appointed Colonial Botanist as well as remaining Director of the Gardens, a position he was to hold until 1881.

At the time the main function of colonial botanic gardens was usually to facilitate the introduction of suitable economic plants, although native plants would be collected as well.  However, Hill's successor as Colonial Botanist was Frederick Manson Bailey, an established botanist already in charge of the herbarium at the Queensland Museum.  Bailey remained in office for 34 years, until his death in 1915, and energetically worked at building up the herbarium collection through correspondence, exchange and numerous expeditions throughout the state.

Since 1855 the herbarium collection has been housed in five different places, and its botanical library in six.  In 1998 the Herbarium moved to its current site within the Mount Coot-tha Botanic Gardens.  The number of plant specimens in the collection is over 890,000, mainly from Queensland.

Herbarium directors
Over the years, the Herbarium has gone through numerous departmental reorganizations and the officer in charge has been known by a variety of titles, from Colonial Botanist through Government Botanist, Director and Chief Botanist:
 1855–1881 – Walter Hill
 1881–1915 – Frederick Manson Bailey
 1915–1917 – John Frederick Bailey
 1917–1950 – Cyril Tenison White
 1950–1954 – William Douglas Francis
 1954–1976 – Selwyn L. Everist
 1976–1990 – Robert W. Johnson
 1990–1994 – (no head)
 1994–2022 – Gordon P. Guymer
 2022–present – Gillian Brown

References

 Henderson, R.J.F. (2002). The Queensland Herbarium, 1855–2002. Queensland Herbarium: Toowong.

External links
 Queensland Herbarium

Herbaria in Australia
1855 establishments in Australia